Tao Huang (died 290), courtesy name Shiying, was a military officer of Eastern Wu during the Three Kingdoms period and later for the Jin dynasty (266–420). Tao Huang was most notable for his administration of Jiaozhou for more than twenty years, during the Eastern Wu and Western Jin eras. He was also responsible for Wu's victory against Jin in Jiao between 268 and 271, one of the few major victories Wu had over Jin in the final years of the Three Kingdoms.

Service in Eastern Wu

Jiao Province Campaign 

Tao Huang was from Moling County, Daling commandery. His father, Tao Ji (陶基) was once the Inspector of Jiao province, and Tao Huang himself held a few posts in the Wu government.

In 263, the people of Jiaozhi commandery in Jiao province led by Lã Hưng (呂興; Lü Xing) rebelled against Wu and aligned themselved with Wu's rival state, Cao Wei. By 268, the Sima Jin dynasty (which replaced Wei in 266) consolidated their control over Jiaozhi and Jiuzhen commanderies and vied to take Rinan. In 269, the Wu emperor, Sun Hao launched a second counteroffensive to drive Jin out of Jiaozhou. Tao Huang (then Administrator of Cangwu), Xue Xu and Yu Si marched from Jing province to Hepu to attack Jin.

After reaching Hepu, Tao Huang volunteered to attack Jin's Prefect of Jiaozhi, Yang Ji at the Fen River (分水). He was defeated by Yang Ji and lost two generals in the battle. His superior, Xue Xu, was furious at him, and considered abandoning the province. Tao Huang responded to Xue Xu, "I was not allowed to do what I wanted, and our armies refuse to cooperate with each other. That was why we lost the battle." Later that night, Tao Huang launched a night raid on the camp of the Prefect of Jiuzhen, Dong Yuan (董元) with several hundred soldiers, and he looted a large amount of treasure from the camp before returning. Impressed by his recent victory, Xue Xu apologized to him and even handed him command over the campaign. 

Tao Huang then used the treasure obtained from Dong Yuan's camp to pay a powerful leader of the Fuyan barbarians (扶嚴夷), Lương Kỳ (梁奇; Liang Qi) to side with Wu. Dong Yuan had a strong general named Xie Xi (解系), whose brother, Xie Xiang (解象), was serving under Wu. Tao Huang sowed discord between Dong Yuan and Xie Xi by having Xie Xiang write a letter to his brother and openly showing exceptional treatment towards Xie Xiang. The plan succeeded Dong Yuan suspected Xie Xi and had him executed. In April 271, Yu Si attacked Dong Yuan and killed him.

Not wanting to face the Jin troops head-on, Tao Huang took a detour through the sea to catch the Jin forces in Jiaozhi by surprise. He fought with Yang Ji's generals, Mao Jiong and Meng Yue (孟岳) at Fengxi (封溪, in present-day Đông Anh, Hanoi) and defeated them. During the battle, they feigned a retreat to lure the Wu troops into an ambush behind the broken walls. However, Tao Huang saw through the ruse and used soldiers long jis to defeat the ambush.

Meanwhile, another Jin general, Teng Xiu, was struggling to quell bandits in the south. Tao Huang advised him, "The people of the south bank rely on our iron and salt, so you should stop them from being sold in the markets. That way, they will be deprived of their farming equipments, and in two years time, they will be destroyed in one battle." Teng Xiu followed his advice and defeated the bandits.

In 271, Tao Huang besieged Yang Ji and Mao Jiong's stronghold in Jiaozhi. Previously, Jin's Inspector of Jiao, Huo Yi swore an oath with the two that if they surrendered within 100 days of the siege, their families would be executed, and if they surrendered after 100 days and no reinforcements came, he would take the responsibility. However, Huo Yi died around the time of the siege, so no reinforcements were sent. In less than 100 days, the Jin army ran out of provisions, and they asked to surrender. Tao Huang had heard of the oath, so he did not accept their surrender but instead provided the defenders with supplies to complete their remaining days. Although his subordinates remonstrated him, Tao Huang argued that his actions will promote the Wu's virtue at home and abroad. After a hundred days, Yang Ji and the others surrendered as planned. For his merits, Tao Huang was officially appoited Inspector of Jiao.

Tao Huang's general, Xiu Yun (脩允), wanted revenge on Mao Jiong, who had killed his father, Xiu Ze (脩則) in battle, but Tao Huang denied him as he intended to spare his life. However, Mao Jiong was soon discovered to be conspiring to assassinate Tao Huang, so Tao Huang decided to have Xiu Yun kill him. In Jiuzhen, the Jin official, Li Zuo (李祚) continued to resist, but after a long battle, Tao Huang recaptured the commandery.

Administration of Jiao 
After Jiao returned to Wu, Sun Hao further appointed Tao Huang as Commissioner with Extraordinary Powers, Chief Controller of Jiao, Governor of Jiao and General of the Front. During his time in Jiao, Tao Huang pacified the Rau and other local tribes in Wuping (武平), Jiude (九德), and Xinchang (新昌), turning them into new commanderies. When combined with Jiuzhen, the commanderies were made up with more then thirty counties. Tao Huang was also popular and beloved by the populace of Jiao. On one occasion, he was appointed as Commander of Wuchang and had to leave the province. The people of Jiao were devastated and insisted on having Tao Huang to stay, so he was reappointed as administrator of the region.

In 279, Jin launched its conquest of Wu. Tao Huang was positioned far from the action and was fighting the rebel, Guo Ma, in Guangzhou at the time, so he did not participate in the defence. Jianye capitulated in 280 and Sun Hao formally surrendered to the Jin forces. Sun wrote a letter to Tao Huang's son, Tao Rong (陶融) to ask his father to surrender. Upon hearing the news, Tao Huang mourned his state for days before replying to give his surrender. Emperor Wu of Jin allowed him to keep his existing positions while granting him promotions.

Service in the Jin Dynasty 
Shortly after Wu's demise, Emperor Wu intended to reduce the number of troops in each province and commandery across the state. Tao Huang personally wrote a letter to the emperor to exclude Jiaozhou from this policy. His reasoning were that Jiaozhou was too far from the capital in Luoyang, and the harsh terrains meant that a rebellion by the locals or officials would be hard to put down. He also pointed out the imminent threat of the independent commanderies around the area and his previous encounters with the Cham kingdom of Lâm Ấp, led by their king Phạm Hùng, and their ally, Funan. In the same letter, Tao Huang also requested that taxes in Jiao be paid with pearls, which were the local people's general source of income, and that merchants were to be allowed to trade in the region. Emperor Wu agreed and granted Tao's requests.

Tao Huang governed Jiaozhou for another 10 years before passing away in 290. It is said that the people of the province mourned his death greatly. He was posthumously named as "Marquis Lie (烈侯)". He was succeeded by Wu Yan, also a former official of Wu.

References 

 Fang, Xuanling (ed.) (648). Book of Jin (Jin Shu).
 Sima, Guang (1084). Zizhi Tongjian.

Year of birth unknown
290 deaths
Eastern Wu generals
Eastern Wu politicians
Jin dynasty (266–420) politicians